Indoor skiing is done in a climate-controlled environment with artificially produced snow. This enables skiing and snowboarding to take place regardless of outdoor temperatures. Facilities for both alpine skiing and nordic skiing are available.

History
Since the early 20th century, there have been four major stages in the evolution of indoor snow centres.

Firstly, centres that had no refrigeration and used an artificial mixture of materials to create a surface substance something like snow, the first of these opened in Austria and Germany in the 1920s. The first recorded indoor “snow” slope was created at Berlin’s Automobilhalle in April 1927 gaining worldwide attention.  According to contemporary reports a wooden slope was created about 720 feet long and sixty feet wide.

The "snow" substitute used was invented and later patented by a British diplomat, L. C. Ayscough, and involved a mixture of powdered mica, soda crystals and sawdust spread on a brush matting surface. The Berlin government were concerned about health risks from the mixture and commissioned the then head of its Municipal Health Bureau, Dr. Wilhelm von Drigalkski, to check it was safe for public use. He confirmed that it was and an order for 200 tons of the material to be delivered by train was placed.

The slope was initially popular and a company was founded to build more slopes in Dresden, Munich, and Frankfurt. It is not known if these were ever created.

A second indoor centre using "Ayscough snow", planned to be a more permanent facility, opened in Austria in November 1927. Known as Schneepalast (German: Snow Palace), it was opened in the Austrian capital Vienna in the abandoned Vienna Northwest Railway Station established by the Norwegian ski jumper Dagfinn Carlsen. The track in the  ski area was built on a wooden ramp. Skiers had to walk up the artificial mountain, because there was no ski lift. However, sledges could be pulled up with an electrically-operated system. The artificial snow had been made by the English experimenter James Ayscough from soda.

After the initial excitement enthusiasm for "Ayscough snow" rapidly waned however as users decided it was not particularly slippery and the initial whiteness rapidly discoloured. The Vienna facility closed in May 1928.

The second attempt at indoor snow centres came three decades later with the first centre that used real snow or crushed ice which was transported inside to a slope covered by a roof and open to urban skiers during cold months of the year in the city of Sayama, Japan. This centre opened in 1959 and continues to operate, although now with on-site snowmaking rather than bringing in snow by lorry.

Thirdly came the first generation of refrigerated indoor centres which used either a chemical mixture to simulate snow or scraped ice.  The first three of these opened in 1988, each claiming to be the first in the world. These were Mt Thebarton in Adelaide, Australia, Casablanca in Belgium, and Ski in Tsudanuma in Japan.

The fourth and current stage of indoor snow centre development came when centres which used ‘real snow’, made by snow-making machines, with no chemical additives, began to appear. These are now the norm for most of the 140 centres that have been built since the first, which was The Snowdome at Tamworth in the UK which opened in May 1994.

Present Day
Since the first indoor snow centre was built in Berlin in 1926, 149 indoor snow centres have been, most of them since 1990. 113 are currently operational in 35 countries on 6 continents.

Most offer skiing and snowboarding but some, primarily in sub-tropical areas in southeast Asia that do not normally see natural snowfall, exist as snow experience centres offering activities like sledging, snowman building and snowball fights.

The number of centres being built continues to grow and 2019 saw more indoor snow centres open worldwide than any other year.  Analysis of the last three decades of indoor snow centre construction saw 2010-19 had the most indoor snow centres built (60), up from 43 between 2000 and 2009 and 34 built in the 1990s.

Asia (especially China) saw the most-new indoor snow centres built since 2010, as it did in the 1990s (back then most were built in Japan).  Between those two decades Europe built the most facilities in the first decade of this century.  The past decade saw the first indoor snow centres open in Africa (Egypt), North America (USA) and South America (Brazil).

Three of the five-biggest indoor snow centres in the world, including two with 50,000sqm+ (500,000+ square feet) indoor snow space, opened in a 12 month period from March 2019 to March 2020.

Many of the indoor snow centres built in recent years are in China which has 34 centres, almost five times more than the next closest country (The Netherlands, with seven).  China’s SUNAC group has become the world’s largest operator of indoor snow centres, operating seven centres, including the world’s three largest. Two more are under construction, most of these opened in 2019-20.

List of Alpine ski halls by country

Australia
 Mt Thebarton Snow and Ice, Adelaide. Operated 1987 - 2005. Built in a state without any ski resorts, it was probably the world's first indoor ski slope on artificial snow.
 Swiss Pavilion at World Expo 88, Brisbane. Two lifts operated for six months. Included a ski slope on artificial snow serviced by a handle tow and a double chairlift operating on a rectangular route.

Belgium 
 Aspen, Antwerp
 Ice Mountain, Comines
 Snow Valley, Peer

China
 Yinqixing indoor skiing, Shanghai
 Sunac Snow Park, Guangzhou
 Sunac Snow Park, Wuxi
 Sunac Snow Park, Kunming
 Sunac Snow Park, Chengdu
 Sunac Snow Park, Chongqing

France
 SnowWorld Amnéville, SnowHall Amnéville, France

Germany
 alpinCenter Bottrop in the SnowFunPark in Wittenburg with a  slope and a 31 percent grade.
 SnowDome Bispingen, Bispingen.
 Alpenpark Neuss (SnowWorld), 300m slope.

Indonesia
 Trans Snow World in Bekasi, first of a series of snow parks that are opening across Indonesia, which includes also a ski slope and ski lifts. It is possible to ski and learn skiing by Ski Club Indonesia, first Ski operator and association in Indonesia

Japan
 Sayama ski resort, Tokorozawa

Lithuania
 Snow Arena, Druskininkai

Netherlands
In 2003, the first indoor snowboard FIS WorldCup contest was held here.
 SnowWorld, Zoetermeer
 SnowWorld, Rucphen
 SnowWorld, Terneuzen
 De Uithof, The Hague
 SnowWorld, Amsterdam
 Montana Snowcenter, Westerhoven

New Zealand

 Snowplanet, Auckland

Norway
Has a  alpine ski track and a  cross-country skiing track suspended from the roof. One-of-a-kind combination of these winter sports. Opened January 2020. https://snooslo.no

Russia
 Snejcom, Moscow. http://www.snej.com

Spain
 SnowZone, in Madrid, has  of snow areas, including a  slope (over 25% grade), a  slope, chairlifts, and other winter sports facilities.

United Arab Emirates
Ski Dubai, Mall of the Emirates, Dubai. A 22,500 sq. meter area covered with real snow throughout the year. The temperature is maintained at -1 to -2 degree with capacity of 1,500 visitors.

Egypt
Ski Egypt, Mall of Egypt, 6th of October.

United Kingdom
 Chill Factore,  outside Manchester, with a  main slope.
 Snowzone Castleford, near Leeds with a  main slope.
 Xscape Milton Keynes, in Central Milton Keynes with a  main slope.
Snow Centre at Hemel Hempstead
Snow Factor at Braehead Soar

United States of America
 Big SNOW American Dream, American Dream Meadowlands, (Meadowlands Sports Complex), East Rutherford, New Jersey (Opened on 5 December 2019)

Nordic ski tunnels (Cross-country skiing )

References

External links 

 Indoor Snow News

 

Cross-country skiing

Ski areas and resorts
Artificial ski resorts